Electronic Gaming Monthly (often abbreviated to EGM) is a monthly American video game magazine. It offers video game news, coverage of industry events, interviews with gaming figures, editorial content and product reviews.

History
The magazine was founded in 1988 as U.S. National Video Game Team's Electronic Gaming Monthly under Sendai Publications. In 1994, EGM spun off EGM², which focused on expanded cheats and tricks (i.e., with maps and guides). It eventually became Expert Gamer and finally the defunct GameNOW. After 83 issues (up to June 1996), EGM switched publishers from Sendai Publishing to Ziff Davis. Until January 2009, EGM only covered gaming on console hardware and software.

In 2002, the magazine's subscription increased by more than 25 percent.

The magazine was discontinued by Ziff Davis in January 2009, following the sale of 1UP.com to UGO Networks. The magazine's February 2009 issue was already completed, but was not published.

In May 2009, EGM founder Steve Harris purchased the magazine and its assets from Ziff Davis. The magazine was relaunched in April 2010 by Harris's new company EGM Media, LLC, widening its coverage to the PC and mobile gaming markets.

Notable contributors to Electronic Gaming Monthly have included Martin Alessi, Ken Williams (as Sushi-X), Jim Allee, "Trickman" Terry Minnich, Andrew "Cyber-Boy" Baran, Danyon Carpenter, Marc Camron (later Director of Operations), Mark "Candyman" LeFebvre, Todd Rogers, Mike Weigand A.K.A. Major Mike (now Managing Editor at GamePro Magazine), Al Manuel, Howard Grossman, Arcade Editor Mark "Mo" Hain, Mike "Virus" Vallas, Jason Streetz, Tim Davis, Ken Badziak, Scott Augustyn, Chris Johnston, Che Chou, Dave Ruchala, Crispin Boyer, Greg Sewart, Jeanne Trais, Jennifer Tsao, artist Jeremy Norm Scott, Game Scholar Leonard Herman, Shawn "Shawnimal" Smith, West Coast Editor Kelly Rickards, Kraig Kujawa, Dean Hager, Jeremy Parish and Mark Macdonald (who later went on to become director of Gamevideos.com before leaving Ziff-Davis). Writers who also served stints as editor-in chief include Ed Semrad, Joe Funk, John Davison, James Mielke, artist Jeremy "Norm" Scott, Dan "Shoe" Hsu and Seanbaby. In addition, writers of EGMs various sister publications – including GameNow, Computer Gaming World/Games for Windows: The Official Magazine, Official U.S. PlayStation Magazine – would regularly contribute to EGM and vice versa.

The magazine is known for making April Fools jokes. Its April 1992 issue was the source of the Sheng Long hoax in Street Fighter II: The World Warrior.

Web-only relaunch (2019–present) 

In March 2019, EGM announced that it was going to relaunch "later this year" into an outfit that will have "a new look and a focus on long-form features, original reporting, and intelligent critique." It enters under the backronym "Enjoy Games More".

In a letter in April 2020, editor Josh Harmon announced that the site would no longer publish long-form articles, prompting speculation that the publication had shut down. Harmon edited the announcement shortly afterwards to confirm that the site would continue "some form of daily news coverage".

Magazine structure 

The magazine includes the following sections:

 Insert Coin
 Letter from the editor – the editorial
 Login – Letters from readers and replies by the magazine
 Press Start
 This section contains a general article about video gaming
 EGM RoundTable – discussions around video games
 The Buzz – industry rumors
 The EGM Hot List – background information about a critically acclaimed game
 Features – feature articles
 The EGM Interview – interview with a person from the gaming industry
 Cover Story – preview of the game featured on the magazine cover
 Next Wave – previews of upcoming games
 Launch Point – short previews of upcoming games
 Review Crew – review section
 Review Recap – recapitulation of the review scores from the preceding issue
 Game Over – Commentary articles on video gaming related topics

The Review Crew
EGMs current review scale is based on a letter grade system in which each game receives a grade based on its perceived quality. Games are reviewed by one member (originally a team of four until the year 2000, then a team of three, and finally knocked down to one in 2008), except for "the big games", which were reviewed by one of a pool of editors known as "The Review Crew." They each assign a grade to the game and write a few paragraphs about their opinion of the game. The magazine makes a strong stance that a grade of C is average. Towards the top of the scale, awards are given to games that average a B− or higher from the three individual grade: "Silver" awards for games averaging a grade of B− to B+; "Gold" awards for games averaging a grade of A− or A; and "Platinum" awards for games with three A+ grades. The current letter grade system replaced a long-standing 0–10 scale in the April 2008 issue. In that system, Silver went to a game with an average rating from 8 to 9, Gold to a game reviewed at 9 to 10 and Platinum to a game that received nothing but 10 ratings. Until 1998, as a matter of editorial policy, the reviewers rarely gave scores of 10 and never gave a Platinum Award. That policy changed when the reviewers gave Metal Gear Solid four 10 ratings in 1998, with an editorial announcing the shift.

In addition, they gave the game (or multiple games in the event of a tie, as with Grand Theft Auto: San Andreas for Xbox and NCAA Football 2006) with the highest average score for that issue a "Game of the Month" award. If a "Game of the Month" title receives a port to another console, that version is disqualified from that month's award, such as with Resident Evil 4, which won the award for the Nintendo GameCube version and subsequently received the highest scores for the PlayStation 2 port months later and Tony Hawk's Pro Skater 2, which won the Platinum award for two separate versions of the game.

In 2002, EGM began giving games that earned unanimously bad scores a "Shame of the Month" award. As there is not always such a game in each issue, this award is only given out when a game qualifies.

Originally, a team of four editors reviewed all the games. This process was eventually dropped in favor of a system that added more reviewers to the staff so that no one person reviewed all the games for the month.

Though the scores ranged from 0–10 on the previous numerical scale, the score of zero was almost never utilized, with exceptions being Mortal Kombat Advance, The Guy Game and Ping Pals.

At the very end of every single magazine made during the Hsu period there is a funny/random message after the absolute last text (copyright/disclaimer text) on the last page.

International expansion
EGM en Español was released in Mexico in November 2002. It was published by Editorial Televisa and is edited by a different staff. Sometimes the content was more focused to the Latin American gaming crowd (e.g. soccer games were paid more attention than NASCAR or American football games), as well as the humor and other features. Sometimes it featured jokes among the Mexican community and sometimes supported the production with a poster. Adrián Carbajal “Carqui”, with a long experience in Mexican gaming magazines (prior to EGM en Español, he worked in now competitor publications Club Nintendo and Atomix), was the editor-in-chief through the entire run. There was a weekly official podcast called "Playtime!" hosted by most of the editorial staff. EGM en Español has been cancelled as of December 2008 due to Ziff Davis Media's economical problems.

EGM was also published in Brazil as EGM Brasil by Conrad Editora since April 2002. Since the last quarter of 2005, EGM Brasil was being published by Futuro Comunicação. With the suspension of U.S. sales of the EGM, the Brazilian EGM was rebranded to EGW (Entertainment + Game World).

In 2006 three other editions of EGM were published around the world. EGM Thailand is published by Future Gamer Company Ltd., EGM Singapore is published by MediaCorp Publishing and EGM Turkey is published by Merkez Dergi.

EGM Turkey got closed in January 2009 for financial crisis.

Internet presence
In 1995, EGMs first online website was nuke.com. It merged with GameSpot in 1996 after Ziff-Davis purchased Sendai Media Group. In 2003, EGM created a new website, 1UP.com, after GameSpot was sold to CNET Networks. Since the magazine's relaunch in 2010, the affiliated website has been egmnow.com

EGM Live* was a podcast hosted every Monday by the editors of EGM on 1UP.com. The podcast was available for download at 1UP.com or the iTunes music store. Much like other podcasts on the 1UP network, the program could include discussion of various message board topics, an analysis of new games being reviewed, a mailbag section, a deeper look into the most recent issue of the magazine, or interviews with special guests such as Marcus Henderson and Ted Lange from Harmonix and Cliff Bleszinski from Epic Games. The "*" at the end of the name was to denote that the podcast was not actually "live" in the general media sense. It was later replaced by 1UPFM, another weekly Monday podcast where 1UP crew members Nick Suttner and Phil Kollar hosted the show, along with other 1UP members.

EGM2EGM2 (stylized as EGM2''') was a video game magazine published by Sendai Publishing from July 1994 to July 1998 as a spin-off of Electronic Gaming Monthly. Unlike EGM, however, EGM2 lacked a reviews section and had a greater emphasis on import games.

Starting in August 1998, EGM2 became Expert Gamer (often abbreviated as XG). Although with a different name, XG continued EGM2s numbering system. XG lasted for 39 issues until October 2001 (with the last issue being XG #88).

History
The first issue of EGM2 was in July 1994. The magazine lasted 49 issues with the last issue under the original name coming out in July 1998. The change of name prompted a cleaner looking redesign although the content of the magazine would remain the same.

Reception
In a 2014 retrospective, Polygon said: "For two decades, EGM'' maintained a focal position in the games media landscape. In the time before the internet, the periodical was a vital conduit for American readers interested in the hobby."

References

External links 
EGM Now – official site of the revised magazine.
 EGM History Page on VideoGameObsesion – Contains information and covers for both runs of EGM.
Archived EGM magazines at the Internet Archive
Electronic Gaming Monthly PDF scans on Retro CDN

1988 establishments in Illinois
Monthly magazines published in the United States
Video game magazines published in the United States
Magazines established in 1988
Magazines published in Illinois